The 2002 Iowa gubernatorial election took place November 5, 2002. Incumbent Democratic Governor of Iowa Tom Vilsack sought re-election to a second term as governor. Governor Vilsack won his party's nomination uncontested, while Doug Gross, an advisor to former Governor Terry Branstad, narrowly won the Republican Party's primary in a crowded and competitive primary election. In the general election, Vilsack was able to improve slightly on his margin of victory four years earlier to win what would be his second and final term as governor.

Democratic primary

Candidates
Tom Vilsack, incumbent Governor of Iowa

Results

Republican primary

Candidates
Doug Gross, advisor to former Governor Terry Branstad
Steve Sukup, Iowa State Representative (1995–2003)
Bob Vander Plaats, family values activist

Results

General election

Predictions

Polling

Results

See also
2002 United States gubernatorial elections
State of Iowa
Governors of Iowa

Notes

References

2002 United States gubernatorial elections
2002
Gubernatorial